RVHS may refer to:

River Valley High School (disambiguation)
 Ralston Valley High School, Alvada, Colorado, United States
 Rancho Verde High School, Moreno Valley, California, United States
 Rancocas Valley Regional High School, a high school in Mount Holly Township, New Jersey
 Redbank Valley High School, New Bethlehem, Pennsylvania, United States
 Ridge View High School, Columbia, South Carolina, United States
 Rondout Valley High School, Accord, New York, United States
 Ryburn Valley High School, Sowerby Bridge, West Yorkshire, England
 Rockvale High School, Rockvale, Tennessee, United States